Wild Life (2007) is the second album by Pinoy rock band, Pupil. The album features Wendell Garcia as the band's new drummer. The band's former drummer, Bogs Jugo, still plays drums in the track, "Set Me Apart," the band's last song with him.

The carrier single of the album entitled "Sala" has reached the top spot in NU 107's Stairway to Seven daily countdown. Even before the release of the album, the song "Set Me Apart" also reached the number one spot in the program.

The album cover was designed by Mia Singson and Dok Sergio. It also features photography from Francis Magalona. It was co-produced with The Mongols' Jerome "J. Astro" Velasco, who also played additional guitars on most of the tracks. Guitars for "Bato" was purely done by Velasco without Yuzon. The album was recorded and engineered in Soundsrite studio in Kalayaan Ave. in Makati City, owned by Boyet Aquino, the original drummer of Francis Magalona's band called Hardware Syndrome, where Wendell Garcia also sessions with. Aquino have also worked as a mixer and audio engineer with Luke Mejares, Freestyle, Gary Valenciano, Kuh Ledesma and many Filipino artists. He also composed some songs with Francis Magalona such as "Spirit Warriors" and "Wala Ka!" The album was mixed by Jack Rufo (of Neocolours) at his own studio called Jack's Tone, Quezon City. Patrick Tirano (Beautiful Machines' co-producer) mastered the album at Wombworks. Pre-production was done by MusashiBazooka (JP Cuison of Kiko Machine and Erl Directo)

The song "Matador" was actually created alongside the song "Set Me Apart." Both were submitted to Sony Pictures Entertainment as demos for Animax theme song. However, Sony chose "Set Me Apart" for Animax. The band later decided to re-record the song "Matador" and they included it in Wild Life album. Since "Matador" was then-intended for Sony, the phrase "like no other" can be heard from the song. Which is Sony's company slogan from 2004 to 2009. According to Buendia during the band's interview in Myx Live, it only took them 3 weeks in making the album.

Track listing

Special Edition

Dubbed as "Wilder Life", the special edition contains 2 discs. The first disc contains all tracks from the original version and have been digitally remastered to create a bigger sound. The second disc contains "light" versions of the band's songs ("Different Worlds", "Sala", "Here I Go Again", "Monobloc", "Teacher's Pet" and "Disconnection Notice"), original demos ("Teacher's Pet", "Sumasabay" and "Matador"), music videos ("Sala", "Monobloc", "Disconnection Notice" and "Teacher's Pet") and desktop wallpapers. The light versions were recorded live during the “Eye in the Big Sky” listers’ night gig; the band gave these songs new chords and different playing styles that can be traced from jazz, acoustic or unplugged, easy listening, blues, bistro, lounge and Latin. An in-depth literature on the band’s success story so far is also included in the CD, as authored by Aldus Santos. Production notes were also provided by the band. It was released on July 10, 2009.

References

2007 albums
Pupil (band) albums